A penumbral lunar eclipse took place on Saturday, March 23, 1940. The moon grazed the southern edge of the earth's penumbral shadow.

Visibility

Related lunar eclipses

See also 
List of lunar eclipses and List of 21st-century lunar eclipses

External links 
 Saros series 102
 

1940-03
1940 in science